is a train station in Heguri, Ikoma District, Nara Prefecture, Japan.

Lines 
Kintetsu Railway
Ikoma Line

Surrounding Area 
 
 Senkō-ji (千光寺)
 Ikoma Yamaguchi Jinja

Adjacent stations 

Railway stations in Japan opened in 1926
Railway stations in Nara Prefecture